Eve M. Troutt Powell is an American historian of the Middle East and North Africa and Christopher H. Browne Distinguished Professor of History in the Department of History at the University of Pennsylvania. She is a previous recipient of a MacArthur Fellowship.

Life
She graduated with a B.A from Radcliffe College and an M.A., and Ph.D. from Harvard University. 
She later taught at the University of Georgia. 
She was a presidential intern at the American University of Cairo (AUC).

She is a member of the American Historical Association.  
She is an expert on Egypt, Sudan, and slavery in the Nile Valley.

Awards
2003 MacArthur Fellows Program

Select Bibliography
A Different Shade of Colonialism, Egypt Great Britain and the Mastery of Sudan, University of California Press, 2003, 
 The African Diaspora in the Mediterranean Lands of Islam, Editors John O. Hunwick, Eve Troutt Powell, Markus Wiener Publishers, 2002, 
"The Tools of the Master: Slavery and Empire in Nineteenth Century Egypt", School of Social Science
 Tell This in My Memory: Stories of Enslavement from Egypt, Sudan, and the Ottoman Empire, Stanford University Press, 14 nov. 2012, 264 p.,

Open-Access Resources 

 Written interview for Afropop Worldwide, 2011
 Audio episode of The Ottoman History Podcast, 2016 ("Narratives of Slavery in Late Ottoman Egypt")
 Recorded video conversation for Afikra, 2022

References

External links
"Eve Troutt Powell: African Slaves in Islamic Lands", Afropop, Banning Eyre, 2006

University of Pennsylvania faculty
University of Pennsylvania historian
University of Georgia faculty
Christopher H. Browne Distinguished Professor
MacArthur Fellows
Living people
21st-century American historians
American women historians
Radcliffe College alumni
Year of birth missing (living people)
21st-century American women